WPKV (98.3 FM, "98.3 K-LOVE") is a non-commercial radio station licensed to serve Duquesne, Pennsylvania in the Pittsburgh media market. The station is owned and operated by Educational Media Foundation and is an affiliate of K-LOVE, EMF's contemporary Christian music network.

History

As WESA-FM
WPKV was originally Adult Top 40 WESA-FM, the sister station of WESA, and was licensed to Charleroi, Pennsylvania; first going on the air in 1967 and under the ownership of Laubach Radio Properties.

Created out of necessity to serve the Mon-Yough area because its AM sister was only licensed to operate during sunrise to sunset hours, WESA-FM offered some separate programming during the day, but at night, picked up where WESA was forced to leave off. Both stations became a full-time simulcast once new FCC regulations were passed eliminating the rule mandating that combination AM/FM license holders originate separate programming for half of the broadcast day.

As WZKT "Z98"
In 1998 WESA-FM abandoned its call letters and adult contemporary full-service format, and flipped to Top 40 as WZKT (Z98), but that format would go away in January 2000 after it was sold to Keymarket Communications.

Keymarket, which had owned and operated "Froggy" branded country music stations throughout Pennsylvania already for ten years, had been looking to gain a foothold in the Pittsburgh market. The opportunity presented itself for Keymarket to acquire WESA and WZKT, and both stations were sold for $1.3 million.

Keymarket, in March 2002, petitioned the FCC for permission to change the station's city of license to Duquesne, allowing them to realize the intended goal of targeting Pittsburgh proper. By the end of the decade, Keymarket had acquired other signals surrounding Pittsburgh enough to target the city from a multitude of different frequencies, and could focus the station on possibly another format.

WPKV today
On August 28, 2009 Keymarket announced that it sold WOGI to Educational Media Foundation, which announced plans to bring the K-LOVE Christian Contemporary music format to Pittsburgh as early as September 1, 2009. This format is on the air today and the call letters were subsequently changed to WPKV.

In late 2018, WPKV Added HD Radio to air Sister channels Air1 and the new K-Love Classics.

Translators
WPKV programming is broadcast on the following translators:

See also

Other K-LOVE stations in Pennsylvania include:
 WJKB, Sheffield/Warren
 WKBP, Benton/Bloomsburg
 WKHL, Palmyra/Harrisburg
 WKHW, Halifax
 WKPA, Port Matilda/State College
 WKVP, Camden/Philadelphia
 WKWP, Williamsport
 WLKA, Tafton/Scranton
 WLKE, Gallitzin/Altoona
 WLKH, Somerset
 WLKJ, Portage/Johnstown
 WUKL, Masontown
 W223BY, Connellsville/Uniontown
 W296CD, Jonestown

References

External links

PKV
K-Love radio stations
Radio stations established in 1967
1967 establishments in Pennsylvania
Educational Media Foundation radio stations
PKV